Rodrigo Rodriguez  (born July 4, 1990) is a Bolivian professional footballer who last played for Club Destroyers in the Bolivian Primera División. On 28 May, 2018 he made his debut for Bolivia against the United States men’s national team in Pennsylvania.

References

1990 births
Living people
Bolivian footballers
Association football midfielders
Bolivia international footballers
Oriente Petrolero players